UFC 209: Woodley vs. Thompson 2 was a mixed martial arts event produced by the Ultimate Fighting Championship held on March 4, 2017, at the T-Mobile Arena in Paradise, Nevada, part of the Las Vegas metropolitan area.

Background
The event was originally scheduled to take place on February 11 at Barclays Center in Brooklyn, New York. However, due to a lack of suitable headliners for the original UFC 208 (scheduled for Anaheim, California), that event was postponed to July 29 and an originally scheduled UFC 209 to be held in Brooklyn was renamed as the new UFC 208. Therefore, this event was also renamed from UFC 210 to UFC 209. This was the fourth UFC event held in the venue.

A number of fans, including longtime UFC commentator Joe Rogan, had expressed hope that UFC 209 would feature Nick and/or Nate Diaz on the card or be held in or near their hometown of Stockton, California. 209 is the telephone area code for Stockton: the brothers have long expressed pride in being from "the 209", and Nate Diaz had even once yelled "209! 209!" at Clay Guida during their fight as trash talk. Rogan even went so far as to say that a Diaz-based UFC 209 could break the company's pay-per-view buy record. Ultimately, the UFC could not come to financial terms with either Diaz brother, and the Stockton Arena was deemed too small for a major pay-per-view event.

A UFC Welterweight Championship rematch between current champion Tyron Woodley and five-time kickboxing world champion Stephen Thompson headlined this event. The pairing met recently at UFC 205, as Woodley retained his title after the fight ended in a majority draw.

An interim UFC Lightweight Championship bout between undefeated Khabib Nurmagomedov and The Ultimate Fighter: Team Lesnar vs. Team dos Santos welterweight winner Tony Ferguson was expected to take place at the co-main event. The pairing was originally booked for The Ultimate Fighter: Team McGregor vs. Team Faber Finale and later UFC on Fox: Teixeira vs. Evans. However, the bout was cancelled both times due to Nurmagomedov being injured and Ferguson pulling out due to a lung issue. Once again the bout suffered a cancellation, as Nurmagomedov had medical issues related to his weight cut and the doctors opted to pull him from the event on weigh-in day.

Igor Pokrajac was expected to face Ed Herman at the event. However, Pokrajac pulled out of the fight in early February citing an injury, and was replaced by Gadzhimurad Antigulov. Then, on February 20, Herman revealed that he was injured and also unable to compete at the event. In turn, promotion officials elected to remove Antigulov from the card and he will be rescheduled for a future event.

Todd Duffee was expected to face Mark Godbeer at the event. However, Duffee pulled out of the fight in mid-February for undisclosed reasons. He was replaced by promotional newcomer Daniel Spitz.

A heavyweight bout between Marcin Tybura and Luis Henrique, initially scheduled for UFC 208, was moved to this event. The pairing was initially delayed as Henrique was unable to gain medical clearance by the NYSAC after a recent corrective eye surgery.

Results

Bonus awards
The following fighters were awarded $50,000 bonuses:
Fight of the Night: David Teymur vs. Lando Vannata
Performance of the Night:  Darren Elkins and Iuri Alcântara

Reported payout
The following is the reported payout to the fighters as reported to the Nevada State Athletic Commission. It does not include sponsor money and also does not include the UFC's traditional "fight night" bonuses. The total disclosed payout for the event was $3,057,000. 
 Tyron Woodley: $500,000 (includes $100,000 win bonus) def. Stephen Thompson: $380,000
 David Teymur: $28,000 (includes $14,000 win bonus) def. Lando Vannata: $25,000
 Dan Kelly: $54,000 (includes $27,000 win bonus) def. Rashad Evans: $150,000
 Cynthia Calvillo: $20,000 (includes $10,000 win bonus) def. Amanda Cooper: $17,000
 Alistair Overeem: $750,000 (no win bonus) def. Mark Hunt: $750,000
 Marcin Tybura: $72,000 (includes $36,000 win bonus) def. Luis Henrique: $16,000
 Darren Elkins: $92,000 (includes $46,000 win bonus) def. Mirsad Bektić: $21,000
 Iuri Alcântara: $68,000 (includes $24,000 win bonus) def. Luke Sanders: $12,000
 Mark Godbeer: $24,000 (includes $12,000 win bonus) def. Daniel Spitz: $12,000
 Tyson Pedro: $24,000 (includes $12,000 win bonus) def. Paul Craig: $12,000
 Albert Morales: $20,000 (includes $10,000 win bonus) def. Andre Soukhamthath: $10,000

See also
2017 in UFC
List of UFC events

References

Ultimate Fighting Championship events
Events in Paradise, Nevada
Mixed martial arts in Las Vegas
2017 in mixed martial arts
2017 in sports in Nevada
March 2017 sports events in the United States